Neolydella is a genus of parasitic flies in the family Tachinidae.

Species
Neolydella pruinosa (Mesnil, 1939)

Distribution
Madagascar.

References

Monotypic Brachycera genera
Endemic fauna of Madagascar
Diptera of Africa
Exoristinae
Tachinidae genera